The UMass Lowell River Hawks men's ice hockey team is the college ice hockey team that represents the University of Massachusetts Lowell. It competes at the NCAA Division I level in the Hockey East Association. The team competed at the Division II level until 1983. That year the University of Lowell was raised to D1 in hockey only and joined the newly formed Hockey East Association. Thirty years later with a name change to both the school and the team, the University of Massachusetts Lowell claimed their first Hockey East regular season title and HEA Tournament championship in 2013.  The River Hawks made their first Frozen Four in 2013 as well.  UMass Lowell would repeat as Hockey East champions in 2014 and then again in 2017.

The River Hawks have played at The Tsongas Center at UMass Lowell since its opening in January 1998.

Program history

Early years
The roots of the current hockey program can be traced back to when the university was called the Lowell Technological Institute (LTI). Hockey started as a club program in 1965–66, and the team was named the Terriers and coached by Richard Morrison. The program initially used the Billerica Forum for practices and home games. The original rink was outdoors at Cushing Field on North Campus. In 1969, Coach Bill Riley was hired to take over the program and was at the helm of a very colorful run for the next 21 years. After LTI's 1975 merger with Lowell State College to become the University of Lowell, the team became known as the Chiefs but were still without a proper facility. But lack of a proper rink was no deterrent for Coach Riley, who benefited from an increase in homegrown talent. Bobby Orr and the Big Bad Bruins of the late 1960s and early 1970s helped grow the game during the Baby Boomer era in Massachusetts.

For the decade of the UMass Lowell program years, "home" games were conducted in a nomadic manner with the team never playing near campus, as no such facility existed in Lowell. Games were played mostly at Skate 3 Ice Arena in Tyngsboro, and it was still technically UMass Lowell's home rink during their first Division 2 Championship run in 1979. In 1980, the university was able to purchase the Billerica Forum (then called the Merrimack Valley Forum) after the allocation of money pushed for by State Senator B. Joseph Tully. The money, however, only provided for the purchase of the structure and land. Though only constructed in 1964, the Merrimack Valley Forum was called a "pig pen" by Coach Riley. A few years later, State Senator Phil Shea was able to secure $500,000 in funding for renovations of the Forum. The coaching staff became the foreman and applied for federal job training grants in order to bring in tradespeople to help with the work. Soon the Chiefs had a place they could call home and rechristened it as Tully Forum.

The Riley era
During the team's formative years in the early 1970s, the Chiefs had no conference affiliation besides a loose one with surrounding schools in the ECAC. By the mid-1970s, Riley had started to assemble the core of players who would lead to UMass Lowell to their first national championship: Tom Jacobs from Hudson, Dean Jenkins from Billerica, and future NHL regular Craig McTavish. However, an envious spat began in the Merrimack Valley between Lowell and Merrimack College, just up the road in North Andover. Merrimack's hockey program was what Lowell had aspired to be: a national contender with a modern home rink on campus. But, up until the 1978–79 season, the Merrimack-UMass Lowell rivalry stood at a very one sided 1–13–1, in Merrimack's favor.
 
With a new post season tournament being sponsored by the NCAA in 1978, Merrimack crushed the competition, including UMass Lowell, in the ECAC tournament and followed it up by going on a tournament run without challenge, defeating both Mankato State and Lake Forest College by a combined score of 18–3. The obsession with Merrimack had grown and festered from the year before. But, with some advance scouting, Coach Riley believed 1979 was the year the Chiefs would jump onto the national stage.

With the help of his student section, dubbed the "Wild Men," Riley wanted to crack the Merrimack goalie, Gilles Moffet, as their defensive depth had taken an early season hit. Their first meeting came right before Thanksgiving, and a theme of turkeys became prevalent in the Wild Men's antics toward Merrimack. The leader of the Wild Men went as far as to send super-imposed pictures of a turkey attached to the Merrimack Goalie to his dorm room. Even Coach Riley had a troll up his sleeve and sent the Wild Men's leader up to New Hampshire to purchase a turkey and tie it up in front of the Merrimack goal. Once the turkey was on the ice, a Lowell 'Wild Woman' ran onto the ice to rescue it. However, the pranks and trolling didn't faze the Merrimack goalie.

We outshot them something like three to one because they were so weak on defense, says Riley, But wouldn't you know, they still tied us, 3–3. It was all our own fault because the goalie was damned if he was going to let the puck in the net.

Going into the 1979 season and speaking at an alumni dinner trying drum up support for the hockey program, Coach Riley wrote a very big check with his wordage toward the upcoming season.

We had an alumni fundraiser before the season, and I was up on the podium trying to jazz up the alumni, Riley related. I don't remember what I said at the beginning of my speech, but at the end I said that if we don't win the national championship this year, it will be a disappointing season.

Still playing at Skate 3 Tyngsboro, Coach Riley sought to distill an attitude of us against the world, according to members of the 1979 Chiefs team. Team morale was not very high, and the Chiefs struggled in the early part of the season.

We were playing like a bunch of punks, says Riley. I was so mad, I hit the locker room door as hard as I could to prove a point. Sometimes, you role play as a coach. I could even put tears in my eyes to emphasize a point. But, this time, I didn’t have to role play. I was really mad. As soon as I hit it, I knew I’d broken something. The next day, I walked in and had it in a cast. I was hiding it inside my sports jacket. For three-quarters of the pre-game meal, I looked like Napoleon. Of course, there was no real hiding it. It was pretty embarrassing, says Riley. I’d go to the bank teller and she’d say, What happened to your arm? Oh, you don’t want to know. No, tell me, what happened to your arm? Well, I punched a locker room door. And she’d give me that look, like, Oh, how childish, how juvenile, how immature.

After that point, UMass Lowell went 24–2 and with the addition of future All-American Paul Lohnes, of the Blue Line, and Mark Jenkins, who had transferred from Union forgoing a pro contract to use his last year of eligibility to play with his brother Dean. Things began to click for the Chiefs and even rival Merrimack could not escape the wrath of the Chiefs, who had been 1–13–1 against Merrimack until the 1978–79 season. After narrowly beating Salem State College in the ECAC Championship, Lowell made their first appearance in the Division 2 National Championship. Being hosted at the Volpe Center in Merrimack gave Lowell de facto home ice, and they cruised past Illinois-Chicago in the semifinal game and made very easy work of Mankato State in the Championship game, winning 6–4.

2 in 3: Bump to Division I
After moving into Tully in 1980 and making the barn on Rte. 129 a permanent home for the Chiefs, the program was rewarded with two more national championships, in 1981 & 1982, with same core group of guys from the 1979 run. In 1981, UMass Lowell was facing Plattsburgh State (NY) for the Championship at Tully Forum. Knowing that Dave Poulin on Plattsburgh State was prone to spastic reactions when thrown off his game, Coach Riley set in on him to take him out of the game mentally. Poulin was to be pressured, hit, and squeezed by the Chiefs players. The strategy worked until Poulin, who had been sent off the ice early, ran into some "trouble" in the locker room underneath the stands.

The kid was so mad, he starting pulling the pipes off the wall, says Riley. Eventually, he pulled off the water pipes. The rink manager came over to me while the second period was still going and said, 'Listen, Billy, that big forward Poulin from Plattsburgh pulled the pipes right out of the wall. There’s water spraying all over their locker room. What do you want me to do?' I said, You know what I want you to do. Don’t do a thing until the third period. Then turn the water off. Sure enough, the Plattsburgh team was going into the third period for the national championship and they had water spraying all over their locker room during intermission. They probably went in the showers to stay dry.

During this time the rivalry with Merrimack was a more even match, the hate, or one might say envy, for the school in North Andover burned the same in Coach Riley.

I was ranting and raving, he says. I got to the end of my vociferous dialogue and said, 'I hate Merrimack. I hate their school. I hate the color of their uniforms. I hate the Indian chief on their shirts… I even hate their #$%@& zip code. I had just run out of things to hate, he says laughing.What you have to understand, he adds with a straight face, is that we had always looked up to Merrimack, so what I said, I said affectionately.

After the 1983–1984 season, Lowell pushed forward to Division 1 and a new league was now forming in the area amongst the former ECAC schools. Although, not all of those schools were keen on the idea of admitting Lowell to the newly formed union. Boston College, in particular, was no friend of Lowell. The Chiefs had beaten them as a D2 school and one could speculate did not want to view Lowell on the same level as fellow institutions joining Hockey East. Clarkson and St. Lawerence were considering joining Hockey East and carried voting powers at this time. In the eleventh hour, both schools voted Lowell into the league and then committed to joining the ECAC. Coach Riley later recounted,

"This was before cell phones and I dropped a lot of quarters into pay phones at the rink making calls. I think I spent more time on the phone than I did on the ice. It was stressful, and it took a lot out of me." 

Lowell's transition to Division 1 was led by Chelmsford Native and future NHL stalwart Jon Morris. Northeastern Coach and Gold Medal Winner Ben Smith gave Morris the nickname of Ghost,

"He'd be in front of their defensemen, then vanish and reappear behind them. "

Jon Morris is still the All-Time Leading Scorer in Hockey East History recording 177 points over his 4 years with the Chiefs. The Chiefs posted their first 20+ win season at the Division 1 Level in 1986-1987. The following season Lowell recorded another 20+ win season and made their first appearance in the NCAA Tournament bowing out to Wisconsin in the First Round. The next 3 years Lowell posted Sub .500 records and after the 1990-1991 season, Riley decided to retire. There had been some friction between University administrator and Riley and after 21 years of service to the University, Riley decided to step aside. At the time there was an NCAA investigation into the program due to a pep talk between the 2nd and 3rd period of a game against Boston University. Jack Parker and Coach Riley had played together at Boston University during the 1960s. While Lowell had sustained success against Boston College beating Boston University had always been too tall of a task for the Chiefs. Coach Riley decided to put his money where his mouth is with his boys.

“Unlike a lot of schools, the university never fed the guys after the game. They were just supposed to go out on their own even though they hadn’t had anything to eat since before four o’clock in the afternoon. So I gave a pep talk between the second and third period. I threw down a couple hundred dollars and said, Listen, if we win this game, the party’s on me"

The Chiefs won the game but the incident was the icing on the cake on the cantankerous relationship that Riley had with the then current administration

“They wanted to say that I was paying the kids, but it was just that the pizza was on me, Sometimes, the pioneers are the ones with the arrows in their backs. The president that we have here now, and was there at the time, never wanted us to go Division I. I got a lot of things here in spite of his wishes. Even when you beat your boss, you still lose down the road.”

The Crowder Era: the Rise of the River Hawks
The lineage of the program and the mark Riley left on the program continues onto the present era. Norm Bazin now coach of the River Hawks was recruited by Riley and donned the "Ranger" style era Lowell across his chest at the Tully.

With Riley retiring a search was put out for a new coach and Lowell brought in former Boston Bruin and then at the time Maine assistant Maine Coach Bruce Crowder. Crowder was instrumental in the rise of the Maine Hockey program under legendary coach Shawn Walsh. Crowder first season was a sub 500 record, but the following season Lowell posted a 20 win season missing the NCAA tournament. The Chiefs were showing signs of things to come with Dwayne Roloson in net and the suburb first line pairing of Mike Murray and Shane Henry. The 1993–1994 season would be the last season under the Chiefs moniker. Though not without its detractors the new nickname would have to be found.

Freshman phenom and Hockey East leading scorer Greg Bullock made his debut with the Chiefs in 1993–1994. Bullock's greatest attribute was his skating ability with a background in power and figure skating. Bullock took full advantage of his lateral skating ability creating many opportunities for himself on uncorralled rebounds. The season itself was Lowell's great success up until that point in Division 1. Crowder was able to scale the mountain that was Boston University in February 1994 and played a memorably infamous home series against Maine the following weekend. In front of two sold-out crowds at Tully Forum what appears in the record book as wins for Lowell. Were in fact actually two ties against the Black Bears. Due to an academic scandal with the Maine Hockey program, Lowell has been retroactively rewarded wins for this series. Lowell finished second in Hockey East and made their first appearance in the Championship game at the Boston Garden losing a 3–2 game to Jack Parker's Terriers. Given at At-Large bid in the 1994 NCAA Tournament Lowell was sent West and was forced to play a de facto home game against Michigan State at Munn Ice Arena in East Lansing in the 1st round. Grinding out a 4–3 win Lowell moved on to face the Minnesota Golden Gophers the next night in front of heavily attended Minnesota crowd. The two teams skated to a 1–1 tie for the first 60 minutes of regulation in a very tight game. During the first overtime, Minnesota Jeff Nielsen potted the game-winning goal off of a Lowell turnover ending the hopes of a Frozen Four appearance.

Season-by-season results

Source:

Head coach history
As of the completion of 2021–22 season

Statistical leaders
Source:

Career points leaders

Career goaltending leaders

GP = Games played; Min = Minutes played; W = Wins; L = Losses; T = Ties; GA = Goals against; SO = Shutouts; SV% = Save percentage; GAA = Goals against average

Minimum 50 games played

Statistics current through the start of the 2020–21 season.

Roster
As of September 14, 2022.

|}

Awards and honors

NCAA

Individual awards

Tournament Most Outstanding Player
Craig MacTavish: 1979
Tom Mulligan: 1981
Paul Lohnes: 1982

Spencer Penrose Award
Bruce Crowder: 1996
Norm Bazin: 2013

Mike Richter Award
Connor Hellebuyck: 2014

All-American teams
AHCA Division II All-Americans

1978–79: Tom Jacobs, F; Craig MacTavish, F
1979–80: Tom Mulligan, D; Paul Lohnes, D; Dean Jenkins, F
1980–81: Paul Lohnes, D; Dean Jenkins, F
1981–82: Paul Lohnes, D; Ken Kaiser, F; John MacKenzie, F
1982–83: Mike Carr, F

AHCA First Team All-Americans

1993–94: Dwayne Roloson, G
1994–95: Greg Bullock, F
2012–13: Chad Ruhwedel, D
2013–14: Connor Hellebuyck, G

AHCA Second Team All-Americans

1986–87: Jon Morris, F
1993–94: Shane Henry, F
2000–01: Ron Hainsey, D
2008–09: Maury Edwards, D
2016–17: Dylan Zink, F

ECAC 2

Individual awards

Player of the Year
Craig MacTavish: 1979
Dana Demole: 1983

Rookie of the Year
Craig MacTavish: 1978
Mark Kumpel: 1980
Dana Demole: 1983

All-Conference teams
All-ECAC 2

1971–72: Mike McElligott
1977–78: Craig MacTavish
1978–79: Craig MacTavish; Tom Jacobs
1979–80: Dean Jenkins; Mike Carr; Paul Lohnes; Tom Mulligan
1980–81: Dean Jenkins; Mike Carr; Paul Lohnes
1981–82: Ken Kaiser; Mike Carr; Paul Lohnes
1982–83: Mike Carr; Rob Spath

Hockey East

Individual awards

Player of the Year
Dwayne Roloson: 1994
Kevin Boyle: 2016

Rookie of the Year
Greg Bullock: 1994
Greg Koehler: 1997
Peter Vetri: 2005
Scott Wilson: 2012

Goaltending Champions
Carter Hutton: 2010
Connor Hellebuyck: 2013
Kevin Boyle: 2016

Coach of the Year
Bill Riley Jr.: 1986
Bruce Crowder: 1994, 1996
Norm Bazin: 2012, 2013, 2017

Best Defensive Forward
Doug Nolan: 1999
Ben Holmstrom: 2010

Len Ceglarski Award
Shane Henry: 1993
Danny O'Brien: 2006
Joe Gambardella: 2016, 2017

Three-Stars Award
Kevin Boyle: 2016

Tournament Most Valuable Player
Dwayne Roloson: 1994
Connor Hellebuyck: 2013, 2014
Kevin Boyle: 2016
C. J. Smith: 2018

All-Conference teams
First Team

1986–87: Jon Morris, F
1991–92: Mark Richards, G
1993–94: Dwayne Roloson, G; Shane Henry, F
1994–95: Greg Bullock, F
1995–96: Chris Sbrocca, F
1996–97: Mike Nicholishen, D; Neil Donovan, F
2000–01: Ron Hainsey, D
2008–09: Maury Edwards, D
2012–13: Chad Ruhwedel, D
2013–14: Connor Hellebuyck, G

Second Team

1984–85: Paul Ames, D
1986–87: Dave Delfino, G; Paul Ames, D
1987–88: Carl Valimont, G
1992–93: Shane Henry, F; Mike Murray, F
1993–94: Jean-Francois Aube, F; Greg Bullock, F
1997–98: Mike Nicholishen, D
1998–99: Anthony Cappelletti, D
2001–02: Ed McGrane, F
2002–03: Ed McGrane, F
2004–05: Ben Walter, F
2007–08: Kory Falite, F
2009–10: Carter Hutton, G; Jeremy Dehner, D
2011–12: Doug Carr, G
2012–13: Connor Hellebuyck, G; Joseph Pendenza, F; Riley Wetmore, F
2015–16: Kevin Boyle, G
2016–17: Michael Kapla, D; Dylan Zink, D; Joe Gambardella, F
2021–22: Owen Savory, G

Third Team

2021–22: Carl Berglund, F

Rookie Team

1984–85: Jon Morris, F
1986–87: Randy LeBrasseur, F
1988–89: Mark Richards, G
1993–94: Greg Bullock, F
1996–97: Greg Koehler, F
1999–00: Ron Hainsey, D
2000–01: Laurent Meunier, F
2003–04: Cleve Kinley, D; Jason Tejchma, F
2004–05: Peter Vetri, G
2007–08: Maury Edwards, D
2008–09: David Vallorani, F
2011–12: Zack Kamrass, D; Scott Wilson, F
2012–13: Connor Hellebuyck, G
2013–14: Michael Kapla, D
2014–15: C. J. Smith, F
2021–22: Matt Crasa, F

Program Records

Individual

Season
Most Goals: Jeff Daw; 27 (1994–95)
Most Assists: Christian Sbrocca; 42 (1995–96)
Most Points: Greg Bullock; 65 (1994–95)
Most Points By A Defenseman: Ed Campbell; 38 (1995–96)
Most Wins: Tyler Wall; 26 (2016–17)
Most Wins By A Rookie: Tyler Wall; 26 (2016–17)
Best Goals Against Average: Connor Hellebuyck; 1.37 (2012–13)
Best Save Percentage: Connor Hellebuyck; .952 (2012–13)
Most Shutouts: Connor Hellebuyck and Carter Hutton; 6

Olympians
This is a list of Massachusetts Lowell alumni were a part of an Olympic team.

Massachusetts–Lowell River Hawks Hall of Fame
The following is a list of people associated with the Massachusetts–Lowell men's ice hockey program who were elected into the University of Massachusetts Lowell Athletic Hall of Fame (induction date in parentheses).

Gary Bishop (1977)
Mike Geragosian (1981)
Tom Jacobs (1984)
Brian Doyle (1985)
Mike McElligott (1986)
Paul Lohnes (1987)
Mike Carr (1988)
Kevin Charbonneau (1989)
Robert Kearin (1992)
Steve Woods (1992)
Jon Morris (1993)
Dana Demole (1994)
Dwayne Roloson (1999)
1979 Team (2007)
1981 Team (2007)
1982 Team (2007)
Shane Henry (2009)
Christian Sbrocca (2010)
Bill Riley Jr. (2013)

River Hawks in the NHL
As of July 1, 2022

Source:

References

External links
 
 

 
College men's ice hockey teams in the United States
Ice hockey teams in Massachusetts
1967 establishments in Massachusetts
Ice hockey clubs established in 1967